Quercus spinosa is a species of oak native to central China, Taiwan and Myanmar, in the subgenus Cerris, section Ilex. An evergreen tree, its leaf traits may be adaptations to altitude.  It is placed in section Ilex.

Subspecies
The following subspecies are currently accepted:

Quercus spinosa subsp. miyabei (Hayata) A.Camus
Quercus spinosa subsp. spinosa

References

spinosa
Plants described in 1884